The Jack Creek Fire was a wildfire in the Alpine Lakes Wilderness of the Okanogan-Wenatchee National Forest in Washington, approximately 15 miles southwest of Leavenworth, Washington in the United States. It was started by a lightning strike on August 11, 2017.

Incidents

August

The Jack Creek Fire was started by a lightning strike on August 11, 2017, about 15 miles southwest of Leavenworth, Washington in the Alpine Lakes Wilderness in the Okanogan-Wenatchee National Forest. The lightning was caused by a cold frontal passage that tracked through the area. It remained dormant for weeks, only growing to  before it burned into receptive fuels and grew.

September

By September 3, the fire had grown to approximately  due to warm temperatures and low humidity.

The fire caused the United States Forest Service to close a number of areas in the impacted recreational areas, including Colchuck Lake, Meadow Creek, Snowwall, Blackjack Ridge, Jack Ridge, Eightmile, Stuart Lake, Van Epps and Trout Lake trails. Select trails reopened on September 26.

Effects/Impacts

In October 2017, the Central Washington Burned Area Emergency Response completed an assessment of the burned area, and requested $12,385 for emergency treatments, primarily due to soil erosion and post-fire flooding concerns. An estimated four miles of trails along Jack Creek, Van Epps and Eightmile drainages have increased threats of rockfalls and flooding.

References

2017 Washington (state) wildfires
Okanogan National Forest
Wenatchee National Forest
August 2017 events in the United States
September 2017 events in the United States